The Women's individual pursuit was one of the 9 women's events at the 2010 UCI Track Cycling World Championships, held in  Ballerup, Denmark on 24 March 2010.

22 cyclists from 17 countries participated in the contest. After the qualification, the fastest 2 riders advanced to the Final and the 3rd and 4th best riders raced for the bronze medal.

The qualification took place on 24 March and the Finals later the same day.

World record

Qualifying

Finals

References

Qualifying Results
Finals Results

Women's individual pursuit
UCI Track Cycling World Championships – Women's individual pursuit